Princeton is the northern terminus of the Princeton Branch commuter rail service operated by NJ Transit (NJT), and is located on the Princeton University campus in Princeton, New Jersey. At the branch's southern end at Princeton Junction, connections are available to NJT's Northeast Corridor Line and peak-hour Amtrak trains. The shuttle train between the two stations is known as the "Dinky", and has also been known as the "PJ&B", for "Princeton Junction and Back". Now running  along a single track, it is the shortest scheduled commuter rail line in the United States. Initial studies have been conducted to add a bus transitway along the Dinky right-of-way as part of a proposed bus rapid transit system.

Service on the Princeton Branch was suspended from October 14, 2018 through May 11, 2019, replaced by shuttle buses, as part of NJT's systemwide service reductions during the installation and testing of positive train control.

Plans to relocate Princeton station 460 ft (140 m) south, proposed by the university in 2006 and approved by NJT and the Princeton Regional Planning Board, were met with opposition from some commuters, residents, alumni, and transportation advocates. The historic 1918 train station closed permanently on August 23, 2013. Approximately 1,200 ft (370 m) to the southeast, a temporary station operated from August 26, 2013 through November 9, 2014, accompanied by various bus routes shuttling among the old station, the temporary station, and Princeton Junction. The new permanent Princeton station, designed by architect Rick Joy, opened on November 17, 2014, with construction continuing on a complex of arts and dining buildings in the surrounding area.

History

The historic 1918 station was constructed when the branch was part of the Pennsylvania Railroad (PRR) under the direction of architect-engineer Alexander C. Shand, who had also overseen construction of the now-demolished Philadelphia Broad Street Station. Designed in the Collegiate Gothic style, the 1918 Princeton station contained a stone station house, a stone freight house, and a canopy-covered platform. The station has been owned by several different parties since the PRR era: Penn Central (1968–1976), Conrail (1976–June 1984), New Jersey Department of Transportation, New Jersey Transit Rail Operations (to October 1984), and Princeton University. It was listed on the New Jersey Register of Historic Places and the National Register of Historic Places in 1984 as part of the Operating Passenger Railroad Stations Thematic Resource.

Relocation controversy

In 2006, Princeton University announced its intention to construct a new arts center, calling for the replacement of the 1918 station house, the shortening of the trackage right-of-way, and the creation of a new terminus  to the south. Rail advocates opposed the relocation, fearing that access to the new station would be less convenient, resulting in decreased ridership that could "threaten the train's existence." The proposal prompted protest from residents, students, faculty and alumni, and led to the creation of the organization Save the Dinky.

In October 2010, the Princeton Regional Planning Board passed a resolution supporting the continuation of train service. On October 3, 2011, Save the Dinky and four local residents filed suit against the university and NJT to stop the move. Meanwhile, the borough, township, and university prepared a memo of understanding in which the school promised to fund a transit study and provide other benefits in exchange for rezoning for the combined arts/transit project.

The station house has been the property of the university since 1984, when it purchased it from NJT, with guarantees of public use. That year it was listed on the state historic register (ID#1742) and in a thematic survey for the National Register of Historic Places. In 2012, NJT requested abandonment of that public use from the state Historic Preservation Office. Save the Dinky contended that the move would breach the original agreement when the property was transferred, would cause inconvenience, and would be poor planning. The university considered it to be a necessary improvement for redevelopment of the neighborhood.

In December 2012, the Regional Planning Board gave approval for the project to proceed. In June 2013, NJT approved a property transfer agreement with the university, involving three parcels around the station and the proposed arts center. The U.S. Surface Transportation Board declined a petition to review the planned move. The New Jersey court system dismissed the 2011 lawsuit in December 2013, and a related appeal in March 2014, and a follow-up petition in July 2014, and a challenge against the Regional Planning Board in January 2015, and two further appeals in February 2016. As of 2017, weekday ridership was down 20 percent from 2012, the last full year of the old station.

Dinky Transitway
The Delaware Valley Regional Planning Commission and New Jersey Transit have conducted studies to develop the Central New Jersey Route 1 Bus Rapid Transit Project. Parts of the proposals call for the construction of a "Dinky Transitway" along the Princeton Branch right-of-way, which would incorporate the rail service and add exclusive bus lanes and a greenway for bicycle and pedestrian traffic. In 2011, NJT indicated that moving the station would not be detrimental to its planning.

In April 2012, the university submitted a revised plan for the arts and transit center, calling for the extension of the station's freight house onto the right-of-way for possible use as a restaurant. The Regional Planning Board introduced an ordinance requiring the land be preserved for a transportation right-of-way that could eventually extend farther into the central business district at Nassau Street. According to the university, ownership of the trackage would have to change hands in order for the extended transitway to be implemented. Approvals were subsequently issued for converting the station house and the expanded freight house into a pair of restaurants, preserving two original ticket windows for kitchen views, and using the wooden arrival/departure boards as overhead menus.

Notes

References

External links
 
 
 Princeton Junction and Princeton stations (USA RailGuide – TrainWeb)

NJ Transit Rail Operations stations
Princeton University buildings
Stations on the Princeton Branch
Railway stations in Mercer County, New Jersey
Railway stations in the United States opened in 1918
Railway stations on the National Register of Historic Places in New Jersey
National Register of Historic Places in Mercer County, New Jersey
New Jersey Register of Historic Places
Railway stations in New Jersey at university and college campuses
Historic district contributing properties in Mercer County, New Jersey
Former Pennsylvania Railroad stations